Kolab River is one of the major rivers of Odisha, India. Its source is at Sinkaran hills of eastern Ghats in Koraput district. The reservoir is popularly known as kolab river. It is a major reservoir for irrigation project and electricity powerhouse.

References

Rivers of Odisha
Rivers of India